Thomas M. Roach Jr. (born September 19, 1961) is an American politician and attorney serving as mayor of White Plains, New York. He took office as acting mayor in February 2011 following the resignation of former Mayor Adam Bradley. Roach won a March 2011 special election held to fill the remainder of Bradley's term.

Early life and background
Roach was born in White Plains. He attended SUNY Albany where he received a degree in political science, and earned his Juris Doctor degree at the SUNY Buffalo School of Law. Upon graduating from law school in 1986, he represented indigent individuals in Bronx County with the Legal Aid Society.

In 1989 he entered the private practice of law in White Plains and has been primarily engaged in civil litigation since then. He was formerly employed with the firm of Mead, Hecht, Conklin, and Gallagher in Mamaroneck. Roach has two children, Henry Roach, and Lawson Roach. He is also a cancer survivor.

Political career
In 2001, Roach ran for and was elected to the White Plains Common Council as a Democrat. He was reelected in 2005 and 2009.

In November 2010, Roach ran for the New York State Assembly and lost by 112 votes to incumbent Robert Castelli, who had taken office in February of that year following the resignation of former Assemblyman Adam Bradley, who had vacated the office after being elected Mayor of White Plains.

In February 2011, Bradley announced his resignation as mayor, following his December 2010 conviction for attempted assault and harassment of his wife, which was later overturned in 2013. Roach, who was as President of the Common Council at the time, ascended to the Office of Mayor of the City of White Plains. Roach subsequently won a March 31, 2011, special election to fill the remainder of Bradley's term.

Election results

 2010 New York State Assembly election, District 89
{| class="Wikitable"
| Robert J. Castelli (REP - CON - TXP) || ... || 21,263 (50.1%)
|-
| Thomas M. Roach, Jr. (DEM - IND - WOR) || ... || 21,151 (49.9%)
|}

 March 2011 White Plains mayoral special election
{| class="Wikitable"
| Thomas M. Roach Jr. (DEM - IND - WOR) || ... || 4,450 (52%)
|-
| Bob Hyland (REP - CON) || ... || 3,020 (35%)
|-
| Glen Hockley (POP) || ... || 1,153 (13%)
|}

 2013 White Plains mayoral election

 2017 White Plains mayoral election

 2021 White Plains mayoral election

References

External links
 Tom Roach Campaign Web site

1961 births
Living people
21st-century American lawyers
21st-century American politicians
Mayors of White Plains, New York
New York (state) city council members
New York (state) Democrats
New York (state) lawyers
University at Albany, SUNY alumni
University at Buffalo Law School alumni
Politicians from Westchester County, New York